Amanda Marie Deloris "Mandy" Playdon is a Canadian actress.

Life and career
Mandy was born in Vancouver, British Columbia.  Throughout high school, she performed in theatre and with gained experience led her to write a two-person comedy piece in which she performed at a professional theatre in Vancouver.

She pursued her career by training with well-known acting coaches in Vancouver for film and television. She recently graduated from a full-time Professional Master Program, which provided her with advanced and current techniques.

She appeared in the television series Supernatural and the television movie Confined.

External links

Canadian film actresses
Canadian television actresses
Living people
Year of birth missing (living people)